Nastassia Viktarauna Karakouskaya (born 1 August 1996) is a Belarusian swimmer. In 2021, she represented Belarus at the 2020 Summer Olympics held in Tokyo, Japan. She competed in the women's 50 metre freestyle event at the 2018 FINA World Swimming Championships (25 m), in Hangzhou, China.

References

External links
 

1996 births
Living people
Belarusian female freestyle swimmers
Place of birth missing (living people)
Swimmers at the 2020 Summer Olympics
Olympic swimmers of Belarus